"Ode to the Mets" is a song by American rock band the Strokes, the ninth and closing track on their sixth studio album, The New Abnormal (2020). Singer Julian Casablancas began writing the song while waiting for a subway train following the New York Mets' loss in the 2016 National League Wild Card Game at Citi Field. Its title was originally conceived as a joke; however, drummer Fabrizio Moretti, finding it a fitting metaphor for the lyrical themes, convinced Casablancas to keep it.

The Strokes first performed the song live at their New Year's Eve 2019 concert at the Barclays Center. It has been regarded by multiple critics as one of the highlights from The New Abnormal and also reached number 27 on the Billboard Hot Rock Songs chart. A music video for the song, directed by Warren Fu, was released on July 24, 2020, coinciding with that year's delayed Opening Day for the Mets.

Background

Singer Julian Casablancas began writing "Ode to the Mets" on October 5, 2016, following the 2016 National League Wild Card Game between the New York Mets and San Francisco Giants, which Casablancas had attended with Strokes guitar technician Paul Vassallo. The Mets' loss saw them knocked out of the 2016 postseason. A lifelong Mets fan, Casablancas began sketching lyrics and a melody while waiting for the 7 train at Mets–Willets Point station. As a joke, he gave it the working title "Ode to the Mets", with the intention of changing it. However, drummer Fabrizio Moretti later dissuaded him from doing so, finding the title befitting of the lyrical themes. Moretti believed that both the Mets and the song evoke "something that you set your heart to and that you love unconditionally but that continues to disappoint you."

Like the rest of the songs from The New Abnormal, the song was primarily recorded at Rick Rubin's Shangri-La studio in Malibu, California. The band performed it live for the first time during a New Year's Eve 2019 concert at the Barclays Center in Brooklyn, New York. Casablancas preceded the performance by announcing that they would have a new album releasing in 2020. "Ode to the Mets" was officially released as the ninth and final track on The New Abnormal on April 10, 2020.

Composition
Atlantic City Weekly writer Ryan Loughlin categorized "Ode to the Mets" as dream pop, with others describing it as a ballad. The lyrics are unrelated to the Mets or baseball generally. Kitty Empire of The Observer found them difficult to decipher. Moretti believed the song to be about "something that you set your heart to and you love unconditionally, but continues to disappoint you", which MLB.com writer Michael Clair felt echoed "the kind of self-deprecation Mets fans are famous for". Of this interpretation, Casablancas said, "That wasn't my intention with the song, but I can’t argue with [it]". AllMusic reviewer Heather Phares described the lyrics as "Casablancas [...] telling off someone who's already long gone", while Helen Brown of The Independent felt it saw the band "[looking] back on their lost years".

Spectrum Cultures Kevin Korber called the song as a "delicate mix of detached cool and melancholy", with Susan Hansen of Clash noting the song's progression "[building] before escalating in intensity, providing a soothing end to the blistering presentation". Casablancas's vocal delivery goes "from monotone to octave jumping". Ella Kemp of NME described the song's distinctive riff as sounding as if it was "put through a wind machine". Helen Brown felt that the song would serve as a fitting soundtrack for the closing credits to the upcoming documentary adaptation of Lizzy Goodman's 2017 oral history Meet Me in the Bathroom, which heavily follows The Strokes.

Music video
A music video for the song was later released on July 24, 2020, to coincide with the Opening Day for the New York Mets, which had previously been delayed due to the COVID–19 pandemic. Inspired by the opening titles of the sitcom Cheers, the video was directed by long-time collaborator Warren Fu and features work from eight different animators. It depicts New York City throughout various points of history; chronologically, it ends in the future with the city underwater, apparently as a result of climate change, adorned with banners featuring optimistic slogans concerning a better future. It also features nods to the Mets, with the team's "Ya Gotta Believe" slogan displayed on a poster, another banner reading "Class of '69", in reference to their 1969 World Series victory and it ends with Shea Stadium under water with a sign that says “Believe In Miracles,” another Mets rally cry. A photo of the band in their early days, from Nick Valensi's private photo collection, also appears.

Reception
Several reviewers regarded "Ode to the Mets" as a highlight of The New Abnormal. Variety writer A. D. Amorosi labeled it an "elegant, odd finale to a sharp-kicking album", adding that no other point on the album was "as slick and theatrical as the melancholy melody of 'Ode to The Mets'". Under the Radars Caleb Campbell felt the song ended the album on a high note, while Kaelen Bell of Exclaim! deemed it a "solid late-career [entry]". In a mixed review of The New Abnormal, Sam Sodomsky of Pitchfork found the song to be one of the album's finer moments, calling it "genuinely pretty" and a "step in the right direction". Some reviewers were less favorable. For The Guardian, Rachel Aroesti wrote that "Ode to the Mets provides a decidedly unspectacular finale", while Jon Dolan of Rolling Stone found the song's "lachrymose lounge moan" to be "pretentious" and "over-the-top". Commercially, the song peaked at number 27 on the Billboard Hot Rock Songs chart.

Casablancas jokingly suggested that the Mets play the song over the PA system after each defeat at their home field in contrast to them playing "New York Groove" by Ace Frehley after each victory.

Billboard named the song as the fifth best rock song of 2020. In May 2020, NME ranked it as the band's tenth best song.

Personnel
Credits are adapted from The New Abnormal liner notes.

The Strokes
 Julian Casablancas – vocals
 Albert Hammond Jr. – guitar
 Nick Valensi – guitar
 Nikolai Fraiture – bass
 Fabrizio Moretti – drums

Technical personnel
 Jason Lader – engineering, mixing
 Stephen Marcussen – mastering
 Rick Rubin – production
 Stewart Whitmore – mastering

Chart performance

References

2020s ballads
2020 songs
Dream pop songs
Music videos directed by Warren Fu
New York Mets
Pop ballads
Song recordings produced by Rick Rubin
Songs written by Albert Hammond Jr.
Songs written by Fabrizio Moretti
Songs written by Julian Casablancas
Songs written by Nick Valensi
Songs written by Nikolai Fraiture
The Strokes songs